Trouville-sur-Mer (literally Trouville on Sea), commonly referred to as Trouville, is a city of 4,603 inhabitants in the Calvados department in the Normandy region in northwestern France.

Trouville-sur-Mer borders Deauville across the River Touques. This fishing-village on the English Channel became a popular tourist attraction (beach-resort and holiday-destination) in Normandy from the 19th century. Its long sandy beach earned then the nickname of "queen of the beaches" ("Reine des plages") or "most beautiful beach in the world".

The name of Trouville is frequently associated with the names of the numerous painters that visited it and painted there, especially during the second part of the XIXth century: Claude Monet, Eugène Boudin, Raoul Dufy, Pierre-Auguste Renoir, Gustave Caillebotte, Fernand Léger, etc.

Trouville remains today a city of leisure and vacation with a casino and numerous festivals, as well as a city of culture (Marcel Proust, Marguerite Duras, Raymond Savignac, etc.). Numerous celebrities own vacation homes in the city: Gérard Depardieu, Antoine de Caunes, Bettina Rheims, Jean-Paul Belmondo, Karl Zéro, etc.

Close to Paris and easily accessible by train, Trouville (as well as neighbouring Deauville) earned the nickname of 21st "Arrondissements of Paris".

Gallery

Population

The town's inhabitants are called Trouvillais in French.

International relations

Trouville-sur-Mer is twinned with:
 Barnstaple, United Kingdom
 Vrchlabí, Czech Republic

See also
Communes of the Calvados department

References

External links

Official website of the city of Trouville
Short history of this surprising town with pictures

Communes of Calvados (department)
Seaside resorts in France
Calvados communes articles needing translation from French Wikipedia